Cutterpillow (stylized as CUTTƎRPILLOW) is the third studio album by Filipino alternative rock group Eraserheads. It was released in the Philippines on December 8, 1995 by BMG Records (Pilipinas), Inc. The album became a highlight in Pinoy music as it introduced classic songs such as "Huwag Mo Nang Itanong", "Overdrive", and the popular "Ang Huling El Bimbo". It was both critically and commercially successful, certifying 11× Platinum by the Philippine Association of the Record Industry (PARI). To date, the album has sold over 400,000 units in the country, becoming the third biggest-selling album in OPM history and the biggest for any Filipino band or group.

The album was re-issued in 2006 and 2008, just before the band's reunion concert. On September 7, 2010, the album was released on digital download through iTunes and Amazon.com MP3 Download.It is also among the band's albums re-released in 360-degree spatial sound in 2022.

Release and commercial reception
Cutterpillow was first launched by the Eraserheads with a concert at the Sunken Gardens of the University of the Philippines Diliman in Quezon City on December 8, 1995. Prior to the concert, the band held a press conference at the Hotel Rembrandt in the same city, where numerous reporters walked out of the event due to the band refusing to perform any songs and insisting on playing excerpts from their album.

The album debuted at number one on the Philippines nationwide album chart, with first-week sales of more than 125,000 copies sold. Sales figures for the first week are the highest of the band's career. The album was certified quadruple platinum in 1996, having shipped more than 175,000 copies in just under a month after its release, becoming the fastest selling album in '90s era. In 2012 this album accredited eleven times platinum by the Philippine Association of the Record Industry (PARI). This album holds the record for the most number of copies sold by a Filipino band of all times and second to Westlife self-titled album for best selling album by a band in the Philippines.

Critical reception

The album received positive reviews from music critics, most of them pointing out the more mature and cohesive, brimming with enjoyable, substantive songs.

In retrospect, David Gonzales of Allmusic gave the album four and a half out of five stars, noticing the more substantive sound with only a touch of "kiddie pop", where he described their previous record Circus as "lightweight and superficial". He applauded the song "Back2Me", saying "[the song] moves on a punkish vibe, the reverb-drenched guitars overlaid with the vocalist singing a catchy, snappy melody reminiscent of Green Day. He further described the opening reverb-edged guitar figure of "Waiting for the Bus" as "enchanting, as is the song itself, highlighted by a rapturous chorus". He likened the song "Poorman's Grave" and stated "In fact, there isn't a bad song on the album". He also compared "Ang Huling El Bimbo" to that of The Beatles, and added "This is a fine, enjoyable album, one of the best ever made in the Philippines."

Cultural impact
Most of the songs became common staples in video bars, and some were used in advertisements in the Philippines, most notably Overdrive, used by Universal Robina for one of their products and Pepsi for its promo Megadrive in 1996 which the band also appeared on its ads, and Ang Huling El Bimbo, which was featured in a McDonald's commercial.

Track listing

Notes
 Francis M. covered track number one as "Superproxy 2K6" for the 2005 compilation album Ultraelectromagnetic Jam with Ely Buendia. During the opening song of the 2022 reunion concert, Francis M. appeared as a hologram and performed Superproxy with the band on stage. 
 The length of track 15 is shortened to 5:30 for the radio edit.
 Track 16 was not part of the album's initial release. It was added a few years later as a hidden track. (Correction: for cassette owners who bought since Day 1, "Cutterpillow" was a hidden track after "Ang Huling El Bimbo".)
 Track 17 is another extra track that was added years later. This one is a sequel to "Overdrive" but is not a song. It is entirely a conversation between the band members and an unidentified woman.
 During the band’s 2022 Ang Huling El Bimbo Reunion Concert, the entire first set was this album played in order, except for the last track, which ultimately became the closing song of the concert. The album track icons made for each song was flashed to tease the next piece that the band played. This was supposedly the “easter egg that hardcore fans would recognize.” as Buendia stated during an interview.

Certifications

See also 
 List of best-selling albums in the Philippines

References 

1995 albums
Eraserheads albums